Pachypus caesus is a species of dung beetle in the family Scarabaeidae.

Description
In the typical form the prothorax  of the males is blackish, while elytrae are completely black. The females are reddish and apterous.

Distribution
This species is endemic to Sicily.

Bibliography
 Vitale F. (1927) Poche osservazioni sul Pachypus caesus Er., Bollettino della Societa Entomologica Italiana. Genova 59:4-7
 VITALE, F. 1908. Notizie su alcuni insetti rari del Messinese. I. Il Rhizotrogus tarsalis Reiche e la sua dimora. II. La fem. del Pachypus caesus Erichson e la sua galleria. Il Naturalista siciliano. Giornale di Scienze naturali, Palermo (II) 20 : 84-92
 ARNONE, M. & SPARACIO, I. 1990. Il Pachypus caesus Erichson 1840: brevi note sulla biologia e la distribuzione in Sicilia. Il Naturalista siciliano. Giornale di Scienze naturali, Palermo (IV) 14 (1-2): 63-71
 FURLAN, L. 1985. Ulteriori acquisizioni sul comportamento di Pleurophorus caesus (Creutzer) (Col. Scarabaeidae). Bollettino della Società entomologica italiana, Genova  117 (4-7): 97-101
  Ragusa E. (1892) Catalogo ragionato dei Coleotteri di Sicilia, Il Naturalista siciliano. Giornale di Scienze naturali. Palermo 12:1-19; 201-205; 233-239; 265-271
  Castelnau F. (1840) Histoire Naturelle des Insectes Coléoptères. Avec une introduction renfermant L'Anatomie et la Physiologie des Animaux Articulés, par M.Brullé, P.Duménil. Paris 2:1-564
  Erichson W.F. (1840) Die Pachypoden, eine kleine Gruppe aus der Familie der Melolonthen. Entomographien, Untersuchungen in dem Gebiete der Entomologie mit besonderer Benutzung der Königl. Sammlung in Berlin, Morin. Berlin 1:29-43
  Scarabs: World Scarabaeidae Database. Schoolmeesters P.

References 

Melolonthinae
Beetles described in 1840